Winson may refer to:

Winson Engineering, British manufacturer of narrow gauge and miniature railway steam locomotives and rolling stock during the 1990s
Winson (cyclecar)
Winson, Gloucestershire, village in England
Winson Hudson (1916–2004), civil rights activist born and raised in Harmony, Mississippi

See also
Winson Green, loosely defined inner-city area in the west of the city of Birmingham, England